The Northern Frontier Regiment (NFR) was formed in March 1957 and was one of the first two properly constituted infantry regiments that Sultan Said bin Taimur of Oman formed. The regiment's crest is two crossed drawn traditional Khanjar daggers pointing downwards, with scrolls carrying the regimental title in Arabic i.e. Kateeba al Hudood al Shamleeah. Members of the Regiment who served in Dhofar are entitled to wear the General Service Medal Oman, its ribbon design illustrated on the right (see Decorations).

Unit history
The NFR and Muscat Regiment are the two most senior infantry regiments in RAO; and were formed from earlier less formal units of doubtful capabilities and were an attempt by British advisors to the Sultan to develop a more credible armed forces to respond to a number of persistent threats from some interior tribes and their financial sponsors in Saudi Arabia. These tensions came to a head in the Jebel Akhdar War in which the regiment played a particularly active part. Once the rebels were driven from the mountain NFR established a base at one of the main villages (Saiq).

The unit would also see service in the Dhofar War along with other regiments of the Sultan's small army, which mostly supporting the Dhofar Brigade's operations in the 1970s fighting Communist insurgents in the south of the country. The NFR were one of the first regiments from Northern Oman to be deployed south to Dhofar to suppress a rebellion in 1964. During the Dhofar Campaign NFR lost many killed and wounded including one of the first British military advisors killed on operations - Captain Alan William Woodman (formerly of the Royal Marines) killed on 13 March 1966.

The NFR remains on the Order of Battle of the Royal Army of Oman and is based in Ibri.

Commanding officers
NFR's Commanding officers have included:
Lieutenant Colonel (later Brigadier) Colin Maxwell - who set up the regiment in 1957 which was based in and around Nizwa during the Jebel Akhdar Campaign
Lieutenant Colonel Hugh Sanders
Lieutenant Colonel Michael Harvey
Lieutenant Colonel Bryan Ray MBE

UK personnel Killed in Action whilst Serving with the Regiment
The following UK seconded and contract personnel were killed in action (KIA) whilst serving with NFR:
 Acting Sergeant Alan Frederick Hedges RM KIA Jebel Akhdar 16 April 1958
 Colour Sergeant Jack Lovell Halford RM BEM KIA Jebel Akhdar 17 June 1958
 Captain Alan William Woodman (late Sgt RM) KIA Dhofar 13 March 1966
 Captain Hamish Brian Emslie MC (late Capt RM) KIA Dhofar 24 May 1966
 Local Captain Stuart James Rae (late RM) KIA Dhofar 12 June 1971

See also
 Omani Civil War (1963-76)
 Sultan of Oman's Armed Forces
 Sultan's Armed Forces Museum
 David Smiley
 Trucial Oman Scouts

References

External links
 Sultan's Armed Forces Association
 Saint Anthony's College Photo Archive
 Royal Army of Oman

Military of Oman
Dhofar Rebellion
Wars involving Oman
Rebellions in Oman